Four Darks in Red is a 1958 painting by American painter Mark Rothko. It is currently in the collection of the Whitney Museum of American Art in New York City.

Description
The painting is composed of the titular four dark, rectangular forms set against a red field. This work, like Rothko's other paintings in the late 1950s, features a predominantly dark palette. Four Darks in Red immediately precedes Rothko's Seagram murals, which share this work's red, maroon, and black hues.

References

 

1958 paintings
Paintings by Mark Rothko
Paintings in the collection of the Whitney Museum of American Art